Heinz Ludewig (24 December 1889 – 16 May 1950) was a German international footballer.

References

1889 births
1950 deaths
Association football midfielders
German footballers
Germany international footballers